Andrew Renzullo (born October 25, 1944) is an American politician in the state of New Hampshire. He is a member of the New Hampshire House of Representatives, sitting as a Republican from the Hillsborough 37 district, having been first elected in 2016, and previously serving from 2004 to 2014.

References

Living people
1944 births
Republican Party members of the New Hampshire House of Representatives
People from Hudson, New Hampshire
21st-century American politicians